David C. Carter is an American bridge player.

Bridge accomplishments

Wins

 North American Bridge Championships (5)
 Mitchell Board-a-Match Teams (1) 1950 
 Spingold (2) 1953, 1954 
 Wernher Open Pairs (1) 1957 
 von Zedtwitz Life Master Pairs (1) 1954

Runners-up

 North American Bridge Championships (6)
 Open Pairs (1928-1962) (3) 1946, 1953, 1954 
 Rockwell Mixed Pairs (1) 1946 
 Spingold (1) 1962 
 Wernher Open Pairs (1) 1960

Notes

American contract bridge players